Epilobium hirtigerum, commonly known as the hairy willow herb, is a species in the family Onagraceae that is endemic to south western Australia.

The species is found in the South West, Wheatbelt and Peel regions of Western Australia.

References

hirtigerum
Plants described in 1839
Rosids of Western Australia